The FASEB Journal is a scientific journal related to experimental biosciences, promoting scientific progress and education. It is published by the Federation of American Societies for Experimental Biology, that was founded in 1912, originally by three societies (29 as of January 2019).

References

Publications established in 1912
Biology journals
Monthly journals
Academic journals published by learned and professional societies
1912 establishments in the United States